Mellona Rocks is a group of scattered rocks lying at the north entrance to Nelson Strait in the South Shetland Islands, Antarctica and extending .  The area was known to the early 19th-century sealers and sometimes included under the names 'Heywood Islands' or 'Powels Islands'.

The feature is named after the British sealing ship Mellona under Captain Thomas Johnson that operated in the South Shetlands in 1821–22.

Location

See also 
 Composite Antarctic Gazetteer
 List of Antarctic islands south of 60° S
 SCAR
 Territorial claims in Antarctica

Maps
 Chart of South Shetland including Coronation Island, &c. from the exploration of the sloop Dove in the years 1821 and 1822 by George Powell Commander of the same. Scale ca. 1:200000. London: Laurie, 1822.
 L.L. Ivanov. Antarctica: Livingston Island and Greenwich, Robert, Snow and Smith Islands. Scale 1:120000 topographic map.  Troyan: Manfred Wörner Foundation, 2009.

References

External links
Composite Antarctic Gazetteer.

Rock formations of Robert Island
Islands of the South Shetland Islands